Silly Boy may refer to:
 "Silly Boy (She Doesn't Love You)", a 1962 song by The Lettermen
 "Silly Boy" (Eva Simons song), a 2009 song by Eva Simons